Minnesota Off-Road Cyclists (MORC) is a  non-profit mountain biking club dedicated to gaining and maintaining trails in Minnesota.  MORC has approximately 700 members.

About
MORC is dedicated to safeguarding the future of mountain biking in Minnesota through the promotion of responsible riding, establishment and maintenance of mountain biking trails, and preservation of Minnesota's natural resources.  

MORC works with local government agencies and land managers to build and maintain environmentally sound and properly built mountain bike trails, sticking as closely to International Mountain Bicycling Association (IMBA) guidelines as possible.

In the fall of 2009, MORC entered into a closer relationship with IMBA, becoming one of a small group of official chapters, however in the spring of 2017, MORC split from IMBA.

Mountain bike trails

MORC and its chapters maintain a select number of popular mountain bike trails in Minnesota.  Here is a brief list of the more popular trails:
Lebanon Hills
Murphy Hanrehan Park
Theodore Wirth Park
Battle Creek
Minnesota River Bottoms

Publications
MORC publishes a quarterly newsletter titled Off-Road.

Chapters
While MORC no longer has chapters, it continues its support and relations with the following groups:
 BLAST
 Cuyuna Lakes
 Minneapolis Offroad Cycling Advocates (MOCA)
 Mid-Minnesota Cycling Club

References

External links 

MORC MOU with 3RPD
Minneapolis Parks: Wirth Park

Non-profit organizations based in Minnesota
Mountain biking teams and clubs in the United States
Cycling organizations in the United States